Santa María Magdalena is a church in Zaragoza, Spain, built in the 14th century in Mudéjar style.

History
It is mentioned for the first time in 1126 as a Romanesque building, which was replaced two centuries later by the current structure. Although internally renovated in the 17th-18th centuries (when the entrance was moved to the former apse antechamber), it has maintained the original square tower, in brickwork, which has several similarities with the Mudéjar towers in Teruel.

Description
The church is on the Latin cross plan, featuring a single nave with cross-vaults with a polygonal apse, and side chapels between the external buttresses. The lower apse has, externally, arches in mixed styles, perhaps inspired to style of the Aljafería Palace, above which are twenty decorative ogival arches and crosses forming quadrangular motifs. The bell tower has four orders with white and green tile decorations.

The high altar, executed by José Ramirez de Arellano (who also made the sculptures in the Holy Chapel of the  Pillar) dates to the 18th century Baroque renovation. Another Baroque feature is the gilt statue of the Immaculate.

See also
List of Bienes de Interés Cultural in the Province of Zaragoza
Mudéjar Architecture of Aragon — World Heritage Sites

External links

Page at Italian  Guide to Spain website—

Maria Magdalena
Mudéjar architecture in Aragon
Romanesque architecture in Aragon
Maria Magdalena
Bien de Interés Cultural landmarks in the Province of Zaragoza
World Heritage Sites in Spain